Marshall R Teague (born April 16, 1953) is an American film and television actor known for his balance of starring roles with powerful supporting characters, allowing him to build a varied and pivotal body of work. He was born in Knoxville, Tennessee. He is of English, French, and Cherokee ancestry. At age nine, he spent time with relatives throughout Asia, where he began a passion for the martial arts training in Korean Kuk Sool Won Hapkido. He holds black belts in both Korean Hapkido and Tae Kwon Do. Marshall joined the U.S. Navy and served in Vietnam. While serving in the 6th Fleet, he won NATO heavyweight kickboxing championship. Upon retiring from military service, Marshall entered the sheriff's department in Shelby County, Tennessee (Memphis). While working undercover, he found acting lessons had become pivotal. In 1978, Marshall moved to Los Angeles, becoming a full-time actor.

His breakout role was as Jimmy Reno in the cult-classic movie Road House and for his recurring role on the 1990s science-fiction series Babylon 5 as Ta'Lon, a Narn soldier, and Nelson Drake. He also had several guest roles playing different characters on the TV series Walker, Texas Ranger.

Marshall has also appeared in The Rock (1996) and Armageddon (1998), both of which were directed by Michael Bay. He is the only actor to portray Lt. Black Jack Pershing in director John Milius' film Rough Riders and Eduard Shevardnadze, the Soviet Union minister of foreign affairs under Mikhail Gorbachev in director Sean McNamara's film Reagan.

Teague's TV guest-star appearances include Walker, Texas Ranger, where he has made memorable guest appearances as different characters.  He was Walker's first nemesis in the pilot episode "One Riot, One Ranger", "Payback", "Codename: Dragonfly", "Last of a Breed Parts 1 & 2", "Fight or Die", "The Final Showdown 1 and 2"
last TV film Trial by Fire. He appearanced on Babylon 5 as a human in the season-one episode "Infection" and made a guest appearance on the Babylon 5 spinoff Crusade as Captain Daniels in the episode "The Long Road". He was in three episodes of the science-fiction TV series Sliders as General Kronos and Sheriff Redfield.

He was a series regular on television in the soap opera Days of Our Lives as Leonard Stacy in 1984, as Brian McCord in 1985, and Colin Lawson in 1989. Also, he was in the soap operas Generations as Officer O’Reilly and The Bold & the Beautiful as Paul 2004. He starred as a series regular on the 1980s HBO series 1st and Ten as Mace Petty. He appeared in the action sci-fi (TV series) Super Force as Frank Stone and the military drama Pensacola: Wings of Gold as Major to Colonel Drayton. In the military drama Soldier of Fortune, Inc., he was David Drummer, and in the 2007 (telenovela) romance drama American Heiress, he was Richard Van Aiken.

Teague has made costarring appearances on several popular TV shows, including Columbo: Uneasy Lies the Crown, Stargate SG-1 episode "A Matter of Time", The Fall Guy (multiple episodes portraying a con man, mob enforcer, car thief), Automan, Knight Rider, Mama's Family episode "Blackbelt Mama", a love interest on Moonlighting episode "North by North DiPesto", She Spies, The A-Team, Quantum Leap episode "How the Tess Was Won", multiple episodes of MacGyver, Renegade, Hunter, Who's the Boss?,  Tales from the Crypt, Star Trek: Deep Space Nine in the season-four episode "Hippocratic Oath", and on Star Trek: Voyager in the season-three episode "Distant Origin". He also portrayed the real-life love interest (Mike Stone) in Priscilla Presley's biographical story (TV movie) Elvis & Me as character Rick Colten.

In the video game industry, he is known as the voice of Krunk in the video game Crash Nitro Kart and as the model for Captain Elias Walker in Call of Duty: Ghosts.

Filmography

Topper (1979) (TV) - Man at Disco 
The Fall Guy (1981-1986) (TV) - Al Ponz
The Phoenix (1981-1982) (TV) - Sheriff 
The Shadow Riders (1982) (TV) - Lieutenant Butler
The Ambush Murders (1982) - Guard
Knight Rider (1982-1986) -  Armand
Starflight: The Plane That Couldn't Land (1983) - Guard
Mama's Family (1983-1990) (TV) - Chuck, Karate Instructor
The A-Team (1983-1987) (TV) -  Travis Mason
Travis McGee (1983) - Nicky Noyes
Automan (1983-1984) (TV) -  Ted
Hunter (1984-1991) (TV) -  Greg Avadon
Who's the Boss? (1984-1992) (TV) - Bart
1st & Ten (1984-1991) (TV) - Mason 'Mace' Petty
Crazy Like a Fox (1984-1986) (TV) - 
Moonlighting (1985-1989) (TV) - Chasing Man #1
MacGyver (1985-1992) (TV) - Logan
Vendetta (1986) -  Paul Donahue
Houston Knights (1987-1988) (TV) - 
The Bold and the Beautiful (1987) (TV) - Paul
Disaster (1987)
Werewolf (1987-1988) (TV) - Austin
Elvis and Me (1988) - Rick Colton
Original Sin (1989) - Richie Morgan
Quantum Leap (1989-1993) (TV) - Wayne
Road House (1989) -  Jimmy Reno
Tales from the Crypt (1989-1996) (TV) - Frank
Baywatch (1989-2001) (TV) - Chief Clark
Trained to Kill (1989) -  Felix Brenner
Chameleons (1989) - 'Turk'
Sunset Beat (1990-1992) (TV) - 
Columbo: Uneasy Lies the Crown (1990) -  Adam Evans
Fire Birds (1990) - DEA Agent Doug Daniels
Super Force (1990) -  Frank Stone Jr.
Super Force (1990-1992) (TV) - Frank Stone Jr.
P.S. I Luv U (1991-1992) (TV) - Agent Irwin
Silk Stalkings (1991-1999) (TV) - Colonel Pike
Love and Curses... And All That Jazz (1991) -  Arthur
Guardian Angel (1991) 
Renegade (1992-1997) (TV) - Sheriff
Star Trek: Deep Space Nine (1993-1999) (TV) - Temo'Zuma
Walker, Texas Ranger (1993-2001) (TV) - Orson Wade, Harper Ridland, Randy Shrader, Rudd Kilgore, Lieutenant Tracton and Emile Lavocat / Milos 'Moon' Lavocat
Johnny Bago (1993) (TV) - Kenny
No Child of Mine (1993) -  George Young
Rough Riders (1993) 
Babylon 5 (1994-1998) (TV) - Ta'Lon
One West Waikiki (1994-1996) (TV) - Marty Essendal
Motorcycle Gang (1994) -  Kincaid
Guardian Angel (1994) -  Nick 
Surgical Strike (1994) - Major
Star Trek: Voyager (1995-2001) (TV) - Haluk
Sliders (1995-2000) (TV) - General Kronus / Redfield
Simon & Simon: In Trouble Again (1995) -  Bruce Marcom
A Dangerous Place (1995) -  Gavin
Fists of Iron (1995) - Peter Gallagher
The Colony (1995) -  Doug Corwin
Pacific Blue (1996-2000) (TV) - Jack Bannister
The Sentinel (1996-1999) (TV) - Wade Rooker
Promised Land (1996-1999) (TV) - Sheriff Oakley
The Rock (1996) - Navy Seal Reigert
The Bad Pack (1997) - Lamont Sperry
Stargate SG-1 (1997-2007) (TV) - AF Colonel Frank Cromwell
Rough Riders (1997) - Jack 'Black Jack' Pershing
On the Line (1997) - Jay 
Pensacola: Wings of Gold (1997-2000) (TV) - Colonel Drayton
Soldier of Fortune, Inc. (1997-1999) (TV) - David Drummer
Armageddon (1998) - Colonel Davis  
Crusade (1999) (TV) - Captain Daniels
18 Wheels of Justice (2000-) (TV) - Terrance Sanders
Crime and Punishment in Suburbia (2000) - Coach
Across the Line (1999) - Ty Parker Johnson
Crossfire Trail (2001) - 'Snake' Corville
U.S. Seals II: The Ultimate Force (2001) - Major Nathan Donner
Dawn of Our Nation (2001) - Paul Revere
What Matters Most (2001) - Raymond Warner 
Second to Die (2002) - Captain Burris
She Spies (2002-2004) (TV) - Phoenix
Robbery Homicide Division (2002-2003) (TV) - Sergeant Wike
Monte Walsh (2003) - Wallace 'Dally' Johnson
Bells of Innocence (2003) - Joshua Ravel
Disaster (2003) - Chief Hackett
Crash Nitro Kart (2003) (VG)- Krunk
Special Forces (2003) - Major Don Harding 
Criminal Minds (2005-) (TV) - Dr. Edward Calder
The Cutter (2005) - Moore
Walker, Texas Ranger: Trial by Fire (2005) - Derek Gibbs
The Pros and Cons of Breathing (2006) -  Dr. Benjamin
House of the Rising Sun (2006) -  George Trilleau
Friday Night Lights (2006-2011) (TV) - John Aroldi
Splitting Hairs (2007) -  Charlie Pluders
American Identity (2007) -  General Farmington
In Plain Sight (2008-2012) (TV) - Alan Cohen
Leverage (2008-2012) (TV) - Rampone
Scoundrels (2010) (TV) - John Stierson
Universal Squadrons (2011) -   Dr. White
Last Ounce of Courage (2012) -  Bob Revere
Divorce Texas Style (2013) - Frank Douglas
Front Porch (2014) - James
American Crime (2015-) (TV) - Ben Callahan
Road to the Well (2015) - Dale 
Hardin (2015) - John B. Armstrong
The Hard Ride (2015) -  Judge Bennett
Oil Run (2016) -  Agent Baker
Amerigeddon (2016) - Col. Crane

Personal appearances
Jaret Goes to the Movies podcast (episode 40 - Road House)

Personal life
Teague has been married to his wife, Lindy, since 1998. Having attended two military academies in his youth, Teague joined the Navy at age 17. During his time in service, Teague won the NATO heavyweight kickboxing championship. Teague has served on the boards of directors of the Quail and Upland Wildlife Federation and Kickstart Kids with his wife.

References

External links

Marshall Teague on American Film Institute Catalog
Marshall Teague on AllMovie

1953 births
American male film actors
American male soap opera actors
American male television actors
Male actors from Tennessee
Living people
American hapkido practitioners
American tang soo do practitioners
American male karateka
American male taekwondo practitioners
20th-century American male actors
21st-century American male actors
People from Newport, Tennessee